Express Dairies is a former brand of Dairy Crest, that specialised almost entirely in home deliveries of milk, and other dairy products.

History
The company was founded by George Barham in 1864 as the 'Express County Milk Supply Company,' so named as they only used express trains to get their milk to London. The major creamery and milk bottling plant was located just south of South Acton railway station on the North London Line. This gave easy and equal access for milk trains from both the Great Western Railway and the Southern Railway.

The company was purchased by Grand Metropolitan in 1969, and sold in November 1991 to Northern Foods. It was demerged from Northern Foods in 1998, and purchased a 51% controlling stake in Claymore Dairies Ltd of Scotland, for £2.2 million.

Express Dairies acquired Star Dairies Food Service Ltd. and certain assets of Star Dairies International Ltd for £3.5 million in February 1999. In June 1999, the liquid milk operations of the United Kingdom of Glanbia plc were acquired for £100 million, and the share capital of Blakes Chilled Distribution Ltd. was purchased in August for £3 million.

Express Dairies announced a joint venture in Northern Ireland with Golden Vale plc in November 2000, that created Dale Farm Dairies Ltd, although that was sold in October 2001. Express Dairies disposed of its UHT business and Frome creamery in July 2002.

Following a period of poor profitability, the business was acquired in March 2003 by Arla Foods, who in turn sold it on to Dairy Crest in July 2006. Dairy Crest sold its deliveries business to Creamline Dairies in July 2013, and its milk processing business to Germany's Müller in December 2015.

Premier Supermarkets

Post war, Britain was changing. The chairman's new son-in-law, American citizen and ex-sailor of the US Navy, Patrick Galvani, had been studying retailing before coming to the United Kingdom, particularly supermarkets. Galvani made a pitch to the board, which resulted in Britain's first supermarket opening in Streatham, South London in 1951 under the Premier Supermarket brand.

In 1960, in an attempt to expand nationwide, Galvani made a pitch to the board to buy Irwin's 212 stores, but they refused to back him; Jack Cohen of Tesco subsequently bought the chain. In 1964, the chain was sold to Unilever's Mac Fisheries chain for £1million. The cash income allowed Express to develop and launch marketing for long-life milk.

References

Dairy products companies of the United Kingdom
Northern Foods
British companies established in 1864
1864 establishments in England
Supermarkets of the United Kingdom
Defunct retail companies of the United Kingdom
Retail companies established in 1864